WGLJ-LP (94.7 FM) is a radio station licensed to Gainesville, Florida, United States. The station is currently owned by Calvary Chapel Gainesville. WGLJ shared this frequency with WVFP-LP, owned by the Faith Presbyterian Church.

References

External links
Calvary Chapel Gainesville
 

GLJ-LP
GLJ-LP
Gainesville, Florida
Calvary Chapel Association
2019 establishments in Florida
Radio stations established in 2019